Class representative may refer to:
in law, a lead plaintiff
in mathematics, A set of class representatives is a subset of X which contains exactly one element from each equivalence class
In Japan and Italy, the equivalent of a class president